Confederacy of Ruined Lives is the fourth studio album by sludge metal band Eyehategod, released on September 19, 2000. The track "Jack Ass in the Will of God" is a reworking of the title track to Southern Discomfort.

Track listing

Personnel
Eyehategod
Mike IX Williams – vocals
Brian Patton – lead guitar
Jimmy Bower – rhythm guitar
Danny Nick – bass
Joe LaCaze – drums

Production
Dave Fortman – producer, mixing
Tom Bejgrowicz – artwork, design, layout

References

2000 albums
Eyehategod albums
Century Media Records albums
Albums produced by Dave Fortman